Rinzin Jamtsho is a Bhutanese politician who has been a member of the National Assembly of Bhutan, since October 2018. Previously, he was a member of the National Assembly of Bhutan from 2013 to 2018.

Education
He holds a BA (Honours) degree in English.

Political career
Jamtsho was elected to the National Assembly of Bhutan as a candidate of DPT from Kengkhar Weringla constituency in 2013 Bhutanese National Assembly election.

He was re-elected to the National Assembly of Bhutan as a candidate of DPT from Kengkhar Weringla constituency in 2018 Bhutanese National Assembly election. He received 4,385 votes and defeated Kunzang Drukpa, a candidate of Druk Nyamrup Tshogpa.

References

1979 births
Living people
Bhutanese MNAs 2018–2023
21st-century Bhutanese politicians
Druk Phuensum Tshogpa politicians
Bhutanese politicians
Bhutanese MNAs 2013–2018
Druk Phuensum Tshogpa MNAs